Marius Sudol is an American molecular and cellular biologist.  He was born in 1954 in Tarnow, Poland. In 1978, he immigrated to the United States to study at The Rockefeller University in New York City, where he received his Ph.D. in 1983. He is currently an Adjunct Faulty at the Icahn School of Medicine at Mount Sinai in NYC.

Research 
Sudol's research is mainly focused on cell signaling, oncogenes, and mechnobiology. The key goal of his research team has been to understand signaling modalities  of WW domain-containing YAP (aka YAP1) oncoprotein and a crosstalk of other WW domain-containing proteins in the Hippo-YAP/TAZ tumor suppressor pathway. He is known for his work on modular protein domains. Among his 180 published papers, he has a number of highly cited articles, which have been referenced collectively more than 18,000 times. His H-index is 71.

Career and service 
Besides his academic affiliations in the US and Singapore, Sudol served in the Scientific Advisory Board of AxCell-Cytogen company from 2000 - 2003. and was a co-founder and co-leader of the Protein Modules Consortium from 2003 - 2018. From 2016 to 2019, he taught at The Beutler Institute in Xiamen University, China.

Currently, he is a member of the Editorial Boards for Journal of Biological Chemistry, Science Signaling, and Oncogene.

Honors, fellowships and grant awards 
Graduated magna cum laude, Jagiellonian University (1978)
Graduate Student Fellowship from Merinoff Cancer Fund (1982-1983)
Damon Runyon-Walter Winchell Cancer Fund Fellowship (1983-1985)
Klingenstein Award in the Neurosciences (1991-1994)
NIH Research Career Development Award from National Cancer Institute (1991-1996)
Human Frontier Science Program Grant Award (1993-1996)
Human Frontier Science Program Grant Award (with Stan Fields; 2000–2003)

References

External links 
Google Scholar
Keystone Symposia
Mount Sinai School of Medicine
Nobelist Institute in China, The Beutler Institute
Oncogene
Protein Modules Consortium
Research Gate
Sudol Lab Website
YAP1 oncogene

1954 births
Living people
American molecular biologists
People from Tarnów
Polish molecular biologists
Polish emigrants to the United States
Rockefeller University alumni
Jagiellonian University alumni
Academic staff of the National University of Singapore
Icahn School of Medicine at Mount Sinai faculty